The Gallows Bride (German:Die Galgenbraut) is a 1924 German silent film directed by Josef Berger.

Cast
In alphabetical order
 Carla Ferra 
 Hans Lutterbeck 
 Georg Margo 
 Grete Reinwald 
 Ernst Schrumpf 
 Wilhelm Stauffen 
 Leopold von Ledebur

References

External links

1924 films
Films of the Weimar Republic
Films directed by Josef Berger
German silent feature films
German black-and-white films
Bavaria Film films